Sapulpa is a city in Creek and Tulsa counties in the U.S. state of Oklahoma. The population was 20,544 at the 2010 United States census, compared to 19,166 at the 2000 census. The population as of 2022 is 22,205. As of 2019, the estimated population was 21,278. It is the county seat of Creek County.

History

Early history
The town was named after the area's first permanent settler, a full-blood Lower Creek Indian named Sapulpa, from the Kasihta or Cusseta band, from Osocheetown in Alabama. About 1850, he established a trading post near the meeting of Polecat and Rock creeks (about one mile (1.6 km) southeast of downtown Sapulpa). 

When the Atlantic and Pacific Railroad (which became the Frisco) built a spur to this area in 1886, it was known as Sapulpa Station. The Sapulpa post office was chartered July 1, 1889 and the town was incorporated March 31, 1898.

Controversy over Creek County seat location
After Oklahoma became a state, each county held an election to determine the location of the county seat. Sapulpa competed with Bristow to be the county seat of Creek County. After five years of contested elections and court suits, the issue was settled by the Oklahoma Supreme Court on August 1, 1913. Sapulpa was ruled the winner. The county courthouse was completed in 1914, replacing an earlier structure built in 1902.

Economic development
When Sapulpa was founded, the main crop of the area was walnuts. In 1898, the Sapulpa Pressed Brick was established, followed in a few years by the Sapulpa Brick Company. This began the clay products industry. Sapulpa is still the home of Frankoma Pottery.

The founding of Premium Glass Company in 1912 marked Sapulpa's entry to glass manufacturing. Premium Glass was acquired by Liberty Glass Company in 1918. The plant, after many changes to the facilities and in ownership,  makes beer bottles under the Ardagh Group.  

Other glass factories in the city included the Bartlett-Collins Glass Company, originally opened in 1914, which was closed by subsequent owner Anchor Hocking in 2008. The Schram Glass Company, which opened a jar and jar cap plant in 1914, was closed by the Ball Brothers in 1931. The Sunflower Glass Plant, which produced window glass, began operations in 1913 and, after being leased to Victory Window Glass Co. in 1924, ceased operations in 1932. 

According to the Encyclopedia of Oklahoma History, Sapulpa was known as  "The Crystal City of the Southwest".

Rail transportation

In 1889, the Frisco opened the route between Oklahoma City and Tulsa, passing through Sapulpa.  The Frisco built a railyard in Sapulpa and by 1900 designated Sapulpa as an overhaul base for its rolling stock.  Also in 1900, construction of the line from Sapulpa to Denison, Texas was started and rushed to completion by March 1901.  
With changes in ownership over the years, the portion of the old Frisco line between Sapulpa and Del City, Oklahoma, near Oklahoma City ended up being owned by the State of Oklahoma.  

In 1998, the line was leased to Stillwater Central Railroad, and in 2014 was sold to them.  The sale contract required initiating a six-month trial of daily passenger service before August 2019—known as the Eastern Flyer—with a financial penalty of $2.8 million for failure to meet the deadline.  

On August 5, 2019, with  no passenger service in place, the Stillwater Central defaulted on the contract and paid the penalty.

Sapulpa in its early days was on the route of the Sapulpa & Interurban Railway (“S&I”) streetcar/interurban line connecting to Tulsa in one direction, and Kiefer, Glenpool, and Mounds in the other. S&I subsequently underwent a series of mergers and name changes, with only the Tulsa-to-Sapulpa portion continuing as the Tulsa-Sapulpa Union Railway.

Route 66
Sapulpa is on old U.S. Route 66, now SH-66 and Historic Route 66 (a/k/a the West Ozark Trail) through town.  Route 66 sites include the Heart of Route 66 Auto Museum, which opened in August 2016 in an armory built in 1948. It features the world's tallest replica antique visible gas pump, at 66 feet, or 74 feet including the circular sign on top.  Still standing is the Rock Creek Bridge, a/k/a the historic Bridge #18 at Rock Creek, a 1921 metal bridge that became a link in the original Route 66 in 1926.

Geography
Sapulpa is located in the northeast corner of Creek County at  (36.003536, -96.104822). A small portion of the city that extends north into Tulsa County was annexed into Sapulpa in 2004. The Creek Turnpike (State Highway 364) branches east from I-44 in northeastern Sapulpa and provides a southern and eastern bypass of Tulsa.

In January 2018, the Sapulpa City Council voted to approve the annexation of approximately 300 acres of land in West Tulsa. The land is bordered to the north by 51st Street, to the south by Southwest Blvd, and to the west by 65th West Avenue. Originally, this annexation included the future site of the interchange of the Gilcrease Expressway and I-44. However, the city has now planned to de-annex this area back to the city of Tulsa.

Demographics

As of the 2010 census, there were 20,544 people, 8,015 households, and 5,497 families residing in the city. The population density was 844.3 people per square mile. There were 8,903 housing units at an average density of 435.4 per square mile (168.2/km). The racial makeup of the city was 77.5% White, 3.0% African American, 10.9% Native American, 0.6% Asian, 0.2% Pacific Islander, 1.5% from other races, and 6.3% from two or more races. Hispanic or Latino of any race were 4.1% of the population.

There were 7,430 households, out of which 32.5% had children under the age of 18 living with them, 54.8% were married couples living together, 12.9% had a female householder with no husband present, and 27.9% were non-families. 24.2% of all households were made up of individuals, and 10.5% had someone living alone who was 65 years of age or older. The average household size was 2.54 and the average family size was 3.00.

In the city, the population was spread out, with 26.1% under the age of 18, 7.9% from 18 to 24, 27.5% from 25 to 44, 23.7% from 45 to 64, and 14.8% who were 65 years of age or older. The median age was 37 years. For every 100 females, there were 91.2 males. For every 100 females age 18 and over, there were 86.9 males.

The median income for a household in the city was $40,372 and the median income for a family was $52,639. Males had a median income of $30,524 versus $21,609 for females. The per capita income for the city was $22,275. About 11.5% of families and 16.3% of the population were below the poverty line, including 15.2% of those under age 18 and 17.4% of those age 65 or over.

Culture and education 
Sapulpa has an organization known as Sapulpa Main Street, one of the various national Main Street programs, the purpose of which is to preserve and enhance the cultural heritage of the town, and to improve its quality of life, by revitalizing the Central Business District as the center of the Community.

In 2013, the Sapulpa Creek Community Center graduated a class of 14 from its Muscogee Creek language class.

Historical sites
 
The following are NRHP-listed sites in Okmulgee:
Berryhill Building (14-20 E. Dewey)
Bridge No. 18 at Rock Creek (the junction of old US Route 66 and Rock Creek)
Creek County Courthouse (222 E. Dewey Ave.)
John Frank House (1300 Luker Ln.)
McClung House (708 S. Main St.)
Sapulpa Downtown Historic District (roughly bounded by Hobson Ave, Elm St., Lee Ave, & Main St)
West Sapulpa Route 66 Roadbed (junction of Ozark Trail of State 66 .25 miles west of Sahoma Lake Rd)

Parks and recreation
The Sapulpa Parks and Recreation System includes twenty-one parks and recreation facilities, including 501 land acres. Sixteen sites are considered developed and open to the public, while five are not yet developed.  Kelly Lane Park Trail, Liberty Park Trail, Davis Park Trail, Hollier Park Trail, and Pretty Water Lake Trail offer one-quarter-mile to one-mile walking experiences.  

Among other facilities is Pretty Water Lake, spring-fed and 25-acres large, open for fishing and stocked with trout and channel catfish/panfish. 

Sahoma Lake covers 277 acres, and fishing opportunities there include largemouth bass, smallmouth bass, channel catfish, crappie, perch, blue gill, and redear perch.

In August 2021 a new $600,000 playground was opened at Liberty Park called the "Everyday Heroes" inclusive playground. The playground has specific areas designed for 2 to 5 year olds, 5 to 12 year olds, and adults.

Newspaper controversy
The Sapulpa Daily Herald gained national media attention in early November 2008 for not reporting the election of Barack Obama as president, reporting only that John McCain had won among the voters of Creek County.

Notable people

Bob Ballinger, Republican member of the Arkansas House of Representatives, taught history in Sapulpa from 1999 to 2002.
 The Collins Kids, musicians, Lorrie and Larry Collins, resided near Sapulpa in the early 1950s.
 Joe Haymes, jazz orchestra leader, lived here for extended periods in the 1940s and '50s.
 Regina Holliday, art teacher, artist, muralist, and patient rights advocate, graduated from Sapulpa High School.
 William Miller Jenkins (1856–1941), a native Ohioan, he was appointed as the fifth governor of the Territory of Oklahoma in 1901.  He moved to Sapulpa in 1920, where he lived for the rest of his life
 George William Miller (1925–2006), former U.S. Secretary of the Treasury under President Carter from August 6, 1979, to January 20, 1981. And previously as the 11th Chairman of the Federal Reserve
 Shara Nova, lead singer and songwriter for My Brightest Diamond. Former backup vocalist for Sufjan Stevens and the frontwoman of Awry.

References

External links
 City of Sapulpa official website
 Jackson, Pauline P. "The Sapulpa and Bristow County Seat Contest." Accessed August 31, 2011 CONTENTdm

Cities in Creek County, Oklahoma
Cities in Tulsa County, Oklahoma
Cities in Oklahoma
County seats in Oklahoma
Tulsa metropolitan area